Illya Serhiyovych Hulko (born 17 November 2002) is a Ukrainian professional footballer who plays as a defensive midfielder for Zorya Luhansk.

Career

Early years
Born in Luhansk, Hulko began his career in the Zorya Luhansk academy from his native city. Then he continued in the Torpedo Mykolaiv and Shakhtar Donetsk academies.

Shakhtar Donetsk
He played only in the Ukrainian Premier League Reserves and never made his debut for Shakhtar Donetsk in the Ukrainian Premier League.

Zorya Luhansk
In September 2022 he signed a contract with his native side Zorya Luhansk and made his debut in the Ukrainian Premier League as a second-half substitute in an away victory over Metalist 1925 Kharkiv on 28 October.

References

External links
 
 

2002 births
Living people
Footballers from Luhansk
Ukrainian footballers
Association football midfielders
FC Shakhtar Donetsk players
FC Mariupol players
NK Lokomotiva Zagreb players
FC Zorya Luhansk players
Ukrainian Premier League players
Ukrainian expatriate footballers
Expatriate footballers in Croatia
Ukrainian expatriate sportspeople in Croatia